In sociology, a social institution has eufunctions (or helpful functions; the Greek word eu means well) when some of its aspects contribute to the maintenance or survival of another social activity. In the complexity of a society, any particular activity can have good and/or bad consequences and it can be associated to eufunctions or dysfunctions.
In the last decades the term eufunction is becoming obsolete, because the notion of function refers to any kind of activity helping or disturbing the maintenance of social stability.

Further reading
 Nicholas Abercrombie – Stephen Hill – Bryan S. Turner, eds., Dictionary of Sociology, New York, Penguin, 1984.
 G. Marshall, "Eufunction", A Dictionary of Sociology, 1998, Encyclopedia.com. (January 8, 2012).

Sociological terminology
Social institutions